Scarponi is an Italian surname. Notable people with the surname include:

Cinzia Savi Scarponi (born 1963), Italian swimmer
Michele Scarponi (1979–2017), Italian cyclist

Italian-language surnames